Phantomville is a graphic novel company set up by writer/artist Sarnath Banerjee and Anindya Roy.  Its aim is to provide a platform for Indian writers and artists to produce mature graphic novels.

Related works
 Corridor
 The Barn Owl's Wondrous Capers
 The Believers
 Kashmir Pending
 Upcoming untitled graphic novel about Dhyan Chand

See also
Indian comics

External links
Official Website

Comic book publishing companies of India